The Blanchard News is a weekly newspaper published every Thursday in the town of Blanchard, Oklahoma. It was founded in 1946 by G.W. "Bill" Van Wie. In 1973, he sold the paper to Ross Coyle and Rollie Hyde.

References

Newspapers published in Oklahoma